Constantin Brâncoveanu is a metro station in Bucharest. It is named after Constantin Brâncoveanu, a Wallachian prince (1654–1714).

It is located at the junction of the Olteniței Road (Șoseaua Olteniței) and the Constantin Brâncoveanu boulevard (Bd. Constantin Brâncoveanu), right next to the southern entrance into Tineretului Park, providing easy access to the Sala Polivalentă (Polivalenta Hall, a frequent host to sport events and concerts). Here one can find "Orașelul copiilor" (City of the kids), the greatest amusement park in Romania.

The station opened on 5 December 1988, two years after the southern section of the M2 Line opened, likely due to lack of demand for the station in the area, when the line opened at first.

References

Bucharest Metro stations
Railway stations opened in 1986
1986 establishments in Romania